The Hong Kong Christian Industrial Committee (Chinese: 香港基督教工業委員會, also called as HKCIC) is a non-governmental pressure group that focuses on labor welfare policy and industrial safety. The group was founded in 1966, originally as a unit of the Hong Kong Christian Council, and became an auxiliary organization later to gain more independence. Its predecessor was the Christian Industrial Evangelism Committee, which was a study group formed in 1961. 

Its special focus in 2001 was on the working conditions of toy workers for Hasbro, Mattel, McDonald's and Disney in Southern China. Since then the group has not published any more recent content on its website.

Active members include Rev. Chu Yiu-ming, one of the founders of Occupy Central with Love and Peace.

See also
Hong Kong Confederation of Trade Unions

Further reading 
 "Educating labour – the Hong Kong Christian Industrial Committee" in: The Star, 13 May 1976.

References 
Politics of Hong Kong
Think tanks based in Hong Kong
1966 establishments in Hong Kong
Protestantism in Hong Kong